Podfather may refer to:
 Joseph B. Weaver, Founder of I.D.E.A. and Regency Electronics, made the first fiberglass/copper laminated circuitboard for the first transistor radio, the Regency TR-1, which some have claimed the iPod copied the design of. 
 Adam Curry, internet entrepreneur
 Jon Rubinstein, iPod developer
 The Podfather, series four of The Ricky Gervais Show
 PODFather, a software company in Edinburgh.